Stefania Menardi (born 18 May 1992 in Cortina d'Ampezzo) is an Italian curler.

At the national level, she is a five-time Italian women's champion (2011, 2012, 2015, 2016, 2017) and a 2013 Italian mixed champion.

Teams

Women's

Mixed

Mixed doubles

References

External links
 
 Stefania Menardi – OA Sport 
 
 Video: 

Living people
1992 births
People from Cortina d'Ampezzo
Italian female curlers
Italian curling champions
Sportspeople from the Province of Belluno